Sard is a dark reddish-brown variety of the mineral chalcedony, similar to carnelian.

Sard may also refer to:
 Sard's lemma, a result in mathematical analysis, named after mathematician Arthur Sard
 Anything from, or related to the Mediterranean island of Sardinia
Sardinians, a people hailing from the aforementioned island
Sardinian, a language spoken on Sardinia
Sardinian literature
Sardinian music
Sardinian history
Sardinian (sheep)
 Sardis, the capital city of the ancient kingdom of Lydia
 Sard, Khuzestan, a village in Khuzestan Province, Iran
 Sard, Lorestan, a village in Lorestan Province, Iran
 Sard, a planet in the Gradius video game series

Şard may refer to:
Şard, a village in Ighiu Commune, Alba County, Romania 
Șoarș, a commune in Braşov County, Romania
Şardu, a village in Cluj County, Romania 
Şapartoc, a village in Mureș County, Romania 
Şardu Nirajului, a village in Mureș County, Romania 
Şoard, a village in Mureș County, Romania 
Saravale, a commune in Timiș County, Romania
Şaroş pe Târnave, in Sibiu County, Romania 
Noroieni, a village in Satu Mare County, Romania 
Șar River (Cormoș), an affluent of the Cormoş River, Romania 
Șar River (Mureș), an affluent of the Mureş River, Romania 
Sáros county, a former division of the Kingdom of Hungary, now in Slovakia

SARD may refer to:
 SARD Corporation, a Japanese racing team, and aftermarket automotive-component manufacturer
 Sudden acquired retinal degeneration, a disease in dogs causing sudden blindness
 Selective androgen receptor degrader
 Software Assurance Reference Dataset, a publicly available collection of thousands of example programs with known weaknesses

See also 
 Sardinian (disambiguation)